Alice in the Cities  is a 1974 German road movie directed by Wim Wenders. It is the first part of Wenders' "Road Movie trilogy", which also includes The Wrong Move (1975) and Kings of the Road (1976). The film is shot in black and white by Robby Müller with several long scenes without dialogue. The film's theme foreshadows Wenders' later film Paris, Texas.

Plot 
West German writer Philip Winter has missed his publisher's deadline for writing an article about the United States. In fact, he hasn't written anything substantial, seemingly hating the country and in the middle of a life crisis – he has only been taking lots of Polaroid pictures of the emptiness (in his mind). Having lost the job and attempting to book a flight from New York City to Munich, he meets a German woman, Lisa van Dam, and her young daughter, Alice, who are also trying to return home amidst a strike by German airport ground crew. After Lisa leaves Alice temporarily in Philip's care, she disappears to deal with the relationship she has recently terminated. Philip and Alice take their flights to Amsterdam on the expectation that Lisa will catch up with them there. As Alice has lived there with her parents and speaks Dutch, she suggests showing him the city while they wait for Lisa's flight. Tension runs high between them as he cuts short the sightseeing trip and his money is running out. The next day, back at the airport, they find out that Lisa was not on the flight.

Alice refuses to wait for her alone in the Amsterdam airport while Philip leaves, so he decides to take a bus to bring her to her grandmother in Germany. Since Alice can't remember the city, Philip reads off a list of cities and "Wuppertal" seems to ring a bell. Alice only knows how the house looks; she can't remember her granny's name or address. After a day of searching, first in the famous Wuppertal Schwebebahn and then with a rented car, Alice realizes that her granny actually doesn't live in Wuppertal. Enraged, Philip brings Alice to a police station for them to take care of her, then tries to unwind at a Chuck Berry concert.

When he returns to the hotel at night, Alice is waiting for him and he's actually glad to see her again. She has run away from the police station and has new leads: during her interview, she remembered that her granny's name is Krüger and the police had told her that she lives in the Ruhr area. The two begin to bond as they continue their search, the only clue being a photograph of the grandmother's house, with no house number and no one in the shot. The search ends when they find the house, but the people living there now don't know Alice's grandmother.

With no solution in sight, they go swimming, releasing their frustration by playfully shouting insults at each other. Now being virtually broke, he decides to go to his parents who live across the Rhine. While on the ferry, a policeman spots them and informs Philip that the grandmother and Lisa have been found. The policeman puts Alice on a train to Munich, where Lisa has told them she'll meet her daughter. Philip has no money for a ticket, so Alice gives him the 100-dollar bill from her secret pocket. Traveling together on the train to Munich, she asks him what he will do there. He says: "I'll finish this story". They lean out of the window, which we then see from outside the train. The camera zooms out to take in more and more of the landscape, until the train disappears from view.

Cast 

 Rüdiger Vogler as Philip Winter
 Yella Rottländer as Alice
 Lisa Kreuzer as Lisa, Alice's mother
 Edda Köchl as Angela, friend in New York
 Ernest Boehm as Publisher
 Sam Presti as Car dealer
 Lois Moran as Airport attendant
 Didi Petrikat as Friend in Frankfurt
 Hans Hirschmüller as Police officer
 Sibylle Baier as The Woman
 Chuck Berry (uncredited) as himself
 Wim Wenders (uncredited) as the Man by Jukebox

Production

According to Wenders, Alice in the Cities, his fourth feature-length film, came at a major turning point when he was deciding whether to remain a filmmaker. He felt that his first two features were too heavily indebted to John Cassavetes and Alfred Hitchcock, while his third was an ill-advised adaptation of The Scarlet Letter. Alice in the Cities was a conscious attempt to make something only he could do.

The scenario of a young girl and a writer thrown together was inspired by his long-time collaborator Peter Handke's experience as a single parent. The influence of Handke's 1972 novel Short Letter, Long Farewell, also featuring an alienated German-speaker travelling across the United States, can be inferred from the film's use of clips from John Ford's Young Mr. Lincoln, itself heavily referenced in the novel. The film can be seen as a response to Handke's novel.

While Wenders was preparing Alice in the Cities, a friend took him to see Peter Bogdanovich's new film, Paper Moon. To his horror, the film appeared to be very similar to the one he was making, prompting him to call his production office and break the news that he was canceling the project, believing the film that they were going to shoot "had already been made". Soon after, Wenders went to Samuel Fuller, who had invited him to come visit after a prior encounter in Germany. Wenders mentioned to Fuller that he had just cancelled a project, and upon finding out that Wenders had already secured the financing for the film, he convinced Wenders that it was a mistake. After a few hours of discussion, Wenders realized he could still proceed, albeit with some extensive rewrites to differentiate Alice in the Cities from Paper Moon, and he called his production office to tell them that the film was back on.

Wenders and Robby Müller had hoped to shoot in 35 mm with the Arri BL, which had just come out at the time, but it was too difficult to find one, a common problem with newly issued cameras. Combined with their budgetary limitations, they were left with no other option than to switch to 16 mm. They filmed with a 1.66:1 wide-screen format, a common European format at the time, and drew it on the viewfinder. According to Wenders and Müller, that was the format they preferred, but due to television broadcast demands, they had to provide a 4:3 full frame format of the film, even though they never composed for it. This would create some problems in later years before everything was rectified with a definitive restoration in 2014.

The film was shot close to chronological order beginning in North Carolina, proceeding to New York, then continuing in Amsterdam and finishing in Germany, all throughout the summer of 1973. As the film progressed, the production grew more confident about improvising each scene. Some parts, like certain hotel scenes and almost anything filmed in a car, closely followed the script due to logistical reasons, but by the end of the film, Wenders said they virtually ignored the script altogether.

Licensing became an issue when Wenders tried to include footage he had shot of Chuck Berry in Frankfurt (presumably in late July 1973). The footage was important as it included a performance of Berry's classic song, "Memphis, Tennessee", where the singer is trying to re-connect with his daughter. According to Wenders, it was also an additional inspiration for the film, but Berry's camp demanded a clearance fee that they could not afford to pay. Instead, Wenders approached D.A. Pennebaker, who had footage of Berry singing the song from the concert that yielded Sweet Toronto. This became a viable workaround, for licensing Pennebaker's footage (which they had to decolorize for the film) was substantially cheaper than clearing their own with Berry's camp.

Music
The film was scored by the German band Can. When interviewed about the experience, Can's Irmin Schmidt stated that it was recorded by Schmidt, Michael Karoli and Jaki Liebezeit, and that they were not able to see the film before recording the music. Instead, they went through a collaborative approach with Wenders, who was very short on time. It was all done in one day.

Reception
In 1974, Nora Sayre and Lawrence Van Gelder of The New York Times wrote that Alice in the Cities is "a film with a great deal to say about Europe and America, about the exhaustion of dreams and the homogenization of nations, about roots and the awareness of time, about sterility and creativity, about vicarious and real adventure and, eventually, about the possibilities of the future". The film also won the Best Film award at the German Film Critics Association Awards.

Later, in 1988, Jonathan Rosenbaum hailed Alice in the Cities as one of Wenders' strongest works, calling it a pungent hybrid of European and American elements "with its effective broodings over American and German landscapes and their ambiguous photographic representations". In 2008, Philip French of The Observer called Rottländer's performance as Alice "unforgettable". He went on to say that the film would not be able to be made today "partly because of the invention of the mobile phone, partly because of our obsessive fear of anything that might be interpreted as paedophilia".

In 2016, US director Allison Anders described Alice in the Cities as "one of my very favorite films, and a guiding light" and praised Alice as "one of the screen's most multifaceted child characters, and one of the most empowered female characters in cinema to this day". The A.V. Club also described Alice as resembling "a genuine little kid" and praised the photography as "gorgeous".

References

External links 
 
 
 
 Alice in the Cities: A Girl's Story an essay by Allison Anders at the Criterion Collection

1974 films
1970s drama road movies
West German films
German drama road movies
1970s German-language films
German black-and-white films
Films directed by Wim Wenders
Films set in the United States
Films set in New York City
Films set in Amsterdam
Films set in West Germany
1974 drama films
Films shot in 16 mm film
1970s German films
Foreign films set in the United States